Sicaya or Silaya is a locality in the Cochabamba Department in central Bolivia. It is the seat of the Sicaya Municipality, the third municipal section of the Capinota Province.

References 

  Instituto Nacional de Estadistica de Bolivia (INE)

External links
 Map of Capinota Province

Populated places in Cochabamba Department